Kenneth Gunn (9 April 1909 – 15 August 1991) was a Scottish footballer who played as a midfielder for Swansea Town, Port Vale, and Northampton Town.

Career
Gunn played for Newmains and Swansea Town, before joining Second Division rivals Port Vale, along with Billy Tabram, for a £400 fee in May 1933. He quickly made an impact at his new club, scoring both Vale's goals in a 2–1 win over Southampton at The Old Recreation Ground on 2 September. He went on to score eight goals in 39 appearances in the 1933–34 season. He scored once in 31 league games in the 1934–35 campaign. Gunn scored once in 28 games in 1935–36, as the club suffered relegation. He appeared 40 times in the 1936–37 season, as Vale struggled to adapt to life in the Third Division North. He was transferred to Northampton Town of the Third Division South in May 1937, and later guested for Portsmouth during World War II.

Career statistics
Source:

References

Footballers from North Lanarkshire
Sportspeople from Wishaw
Scottish footballers
Association football midfielders
Swansea City A.F.C. players
Port Vale F.C. players
Northampton Town F.C. players
Portsmouth F.C. wartime guest players
English Football League players
1909 births
1991 deaths
People from Newmains